The Unified Command provides Incident Command System/Unified Command (ICS) for coordinating response to the Deepwater Horizon oil spill.

The organization was initially headquartered at the Shell Robert Training and Conference Center in Robert, Louisiana.  Robert has 20 streets and one stop light.  On June 15, 2010, they announced plans to move its 350 staff into  of space to downtown New Orleans, Louisiana near the Superdome. 

The group works via consensus on managing the spill and making official statements.  Incident commanders from each group report to the National Incident Commander, Admiral Thad Allen, USCG.  The Command has Incident Command Centers in Houma, Louisiana; Mobile, Alabama; and Miami, Florida (moving on June 11 from St. Petersburg, Florida).

Among the functions is the Joint Information Center, consisting of Public information officers from the various components which coordinates the daily news.

Components
Members of the command are:
BP
Transocean
U.S. Coast Guard
Minerals Management Service
NOAA
U.S. Environmental Protection Agency
U.S. Department of Homeland Security
U.S. Department of Interior
U.S. Department of Defense
U.S. Fish and Wildlife Service
U.S. National Park Service
U.S. Department of State
U.S. Geological Survey
Centers for Disease Control and Prevention
Occupational Safety and Health Administration

References

External links
deepwaterhorizonresponse.com

Deepwater Horizon oil spill